The 2020–21 Vijay Hazare Trophy was the 19th season of the Vijay Hazare Trophy, a List A cricket tournament in India. It was contested by 38 teams, divided into six groups, with six teams in Group A. Baroda, Chhattisgarh, Goa, Gujarat, Hyderabad and Tripura were placed in Group A, with all the matches taking place in Surat. Gujarat won Group A to qualify for the knockout stage of the tournament.

Points table

Fixtures

Round 1

Round 2

Round 3

Round 4

Round 5

References

Vijay Hazare Trophy
Vijay Hazare Trophy